NGC 613 is a barred spiral galaxy located 67 million light years away in the southern constellation of Sculptor. This galaxy was discovered in 1798 by German-English astronomer William Herschel, then re-discovered and catalogued by Scottish astronomer James Dunlop. It was first photographed in 1912, which revealed the spiral form of the nebula. During the twentieth century, radio telescope observations showed that a linear feature in the nucleus was a relatively strong source of radio emission.

NGC 613 is inclined by an angle of 37° to the line of sight from the Earth along a position angle of 125°. The morphological classification of NGC 613 is SBbc(rs), indicating that it is a spiral galaxy with a bar across the nucleus (SB), a weak inner ring structure circling the bar (rs), and moderate to loosely wound spiral arms (bc).  The bar is relatively broad but irregular in profile with a position angle that varies from 115–124° and dust lanes located along the leading edges. Star formation is occurring at the ends of the bar and extending along the well-defined spiral arms. The central bulge is readily apparent, with a radius of 14″.

The classification of the nucleus is of type HII, indicating a match to the spectrum of an H II region. Near the core, the stars have a velocity dispersion of 136 ± 20 km/s. Observations suggest the presence of a supermassive black hole at the core with a mass in the range  times the mass of the Sun.

On September 20, 2016, Argentinian amateur astronomer Victor Buso captured supernova SN 2016gkg in NGC 613, just as it was starting to erupt. This was a type IIb supernova, a supernova that initially shows a hydrogen envelope like a type II supernova, but later loses the hydrogen lines in its spectrum to appear like a type Ib supernova. It showed the double peak that is common to many type IIb supernovae, rising to around magnitude 15.5 shortly after discovery and then again about 20 days later. The progenitor star has been identified in Hubble Space Telescope images from before its collapse, and it is likely to have been a yellow supergiant.

References

Gallery

External links

 Supernova SN 2016gkg in NGC 613 from The Virtual Telescope Project

Sculptor (constellation)
Barred spiral galaxies
0613
005849